Michael A. Vereb Sr. is an American politician who served in the Pennsylvania House of Representatives, representing the 150th legislative district from 2007 to 2017. He was first elected in 2006.

Vereb graduated from the Montgomery County Police Academy in 1986 and worked for the West Consohohocken Police Department and in Corporate Security for Comcast and Day and Zimmerman. He served as president of the West Norriton Township Board of Commissioners prior to his election to the House of Representatives.  On January 12, 2016, Vereb announced that he will not seek re-election in 2016 election.

In 2023, Vereb was named Director of Legislative Affairs for incoming Democratic Governor Josh Shapiro.

References

External links
State Representative Mike Vereb official PA House site
State Representative Mike Vereb official Party site

Republican Party members of the Pennsylvania House of Representatives
Living people
People from Montgomery County, Pennsylvania
State cabinet secretaries of Pennsylvania
1966 births
21st-century American politicians